Michael George Raymond Agostini (23 January 1935 – 12 May 2016) was a Trinidadian track and field athlete. He was the first athlete from his country to win a gold medal at what is now known as the Commonwealth Games, when he won the 100 yards final in Vancouver, British Columbia, Canada, on 31 July 1954.

Early life 
Michael Agostini was born on 23 January 1935 at Port-of-Spain, Trinidad. His family had interests in sports: his father played football, his mother played hockey, and all his siblings participated in football and athletics events at St. Mary's College, where they studied.

Athletics career 
Agostini participated in athletics, football, and boxing in his school days. In 1952, at Kingston, he defeated Jamaican sprinter Herb McKenley, who had won one gold and two silver medals at the 1952 Helsinki Olympics. On a scholarship, Agostini enrolled at Villanova University, where he received training from Jumbo Elliott. On 23 January 1954, his 19th birthday,  he set a world indoor record for over 100 yards at Washington, beating Olympic champion Lindy Remigino. The same year, he competed in the 1954 Commonwealth Games at Vancouver, Canada, and won gold in the 100 yards race (9.6). He defeated Canadian Don McFarlane (9.7) and Australian Hec Hogan (9.7), becoming the first athlete from Trinidad and Tobago to win gold at the Commonwealth Games. Hogan was then in the news for tying the world records of 100 yards (9.3) and 100 m (10.2) and was the most anticipated winner. Reports suggest that Hogan's performance was hampered after he was informed that Agostini had ironically stated in a pre-Games interview, "Who the heck is Hogan?" when questioned about him.

In 1955 Agostini participated in the Pan American Games held in Mexico and won a silver and a bronze in the 100 m and 200 m races, respectively. He also won silver at the 1959 Chicago Pan American Games in the 100 m, a bronze in the 200 m, and another bronze in the 4 × 100 m relay.

In the next Commonwealth Games at Cardiff in 1958, he stood third in the 100 yards run behind Keith Gardner of Jamaica and Tom Robinson of Bahamas. Agostini won another gold in the 1959 British West Indies Championships in the 100 m and a bronze in the 200 m.

Agostini had also represented Trinidad and Tobago at the Men's 100 m and Men's 200 m at the 1956 Summer Olympics, ranking 6th and 4th, respectively.

Post-retirement
Agostini retired from active sports in the late 1950s. He graduated with a degree in economics from Fresno State University, California, in 1958. In the late 1950s Agostini moved to Australia and married Pamela, with whom he had two daughters and two sons. He received Australian citizenship in 1961. He coached various sprinters, including Ralph Doubell, Andrew Ratcliffe, Peter Vassella, and Jenny Lamy. He worked as a freelance journalist and as a teacher for a brief time, and also served as editor and publisher for Track and Field magazine in the mid-1960s. He edited numerous periodicals and authored nine books. In 2007, Mike Agostini was inducted into the Fresno County Athletic Hall of Fame. In his later years, he suffered from arthritis and pancreatic cancer. He died on 12 May 2016 of cancer in Sydney.

References

External links 

 Profile at sportarchivestt.com
 Profile at Best of Trinidad

1935 births
2016 deaths
Trinidad and Tobago male sprinters
Australian sportswriters
Australian businesspeople
Athletes (track and field) at the 1954 British Empire and Commonwealth Games
Athletes (track and field) at the 1958 British Empire and Commonwealth Games
Athletes (track and field) at the 1955 Pan American Games
Athletes (track and field) at the 1959 Pan American Games
Athletes (track and field) at the 1956 Summer Olympics
Olympic athletes of Trinidad and Tobago
Commonwealth Games medallists in athletics
Commonwealth Games gold medallists for Trinidad and Tobago
Commonwealth Games bronze medallists for Trinidad and Tobago
Pan American Games silver medalists for Trinidad and Tobago
Pan American Games bronze medalists for Trinidad and Tobago
Pan American Games silver medalists for the British West Indies
Pan American Games bronze medalists for the British West Indies
Pan American Games medalists in athletics (track and field)
Deaths from cancer in New South Wales
Track and field athletes from California
Villanova Wildcats men's track and field athletes
Medalists at the 1955 Pan American Games
Medalists at the 1959 Pan American Games
Medallists at the 1954 British Empire and Commonwealth Games
Medallists at the 1958 British Empire and Commonwealth Games